Tony Rice (born September 5, 1967) is an American former professional football player who was a quarterback in the Canadian Football League (CFL) and World League of American Football. Rice is perhaps best remembered as the dynamic option quarterback of the University of Notre Dame's 1988 National Championship Team under coach Lou Holtz. Rice played professional football for three seasons for the CFL's Saskatchewan Roughriders and the Barcelona Dragons of the World League from 1990 to 1992. He also played for Munich Thunder in the FLE (Football League of Europe) in 1994.

Recruitment and Proposition 48
While growing up in Woodruff, South Carolina, Rice played high school football for Woodruff High School under Coach Willie Varner.  Rice entered Notre Dame in 1986 and was the crown jewel in Holtz's first recruiting class.  These incoming freshmen were also the first to be bound by the NCAA rules of Proposition 48, which stated that in order to participate during his (or her) freshman year, an athlete must (1) be a high school graduate; (2) have a high school grade point average of 2.0 in an 11-course core curriculum; and (3) have scored 700 (out of a possible 1600) on the SAT or 17 (out of a possible 36) on the ACT. If he (or she) failed to meet those standards, the athlete would not be allowed to play or practice with a college team his (or her) freshman year.  Because Rice failed to meet the required 700 on his SAT (he scored a 690), he was forced to sit out the entire 1986 season.  Even with future NFL quarterback Steve Beuerlein leading the offense, the team struggled to a 5-6 record.

1987 Season
In 1987, Tony Rice became the starting quarterback for Notre Dame following an injury to Terry Andrysiak. The Irish finished the season 8-4 and earned a berth to the Cotton Bowl Classic, where they lost 35-10 to 13th-ranked Texas A&M in a game where Rice played only sparingly.  Despite the loss, the team showed dramatic improvement and finished the year ranked #17 — the team's first Top-25 finish since 1980.

Rice was a perfect fit for Holtz's ball control, run-oriented offense. Despite standing only 6'1" 200 lbs., he had great speed (4.48 40 yard dash time) for a quarterback, and tremendous strength, which made him an incredibly difficult player to contain. For the year he finished with over 1,000 yards of total offense and 8 total touchdowns (663 yards, 1 touchdown passing and 337 yards, 7 touchdowns rushing).

Matchup versus USC '87
Tony Rice's first encounter with Southern Cal was his second start of his career on October 24, 1987 as Notre Dame defeated the ranked USC Trojans (8-4) 26-15. Rice had a 26-yard touchdown run that gave the Irish a 10-7 lead with 2:55 left in the first half. He finished with 9 rushes for 56 yards and completed 3-of-7 passes for 47 yards.

Matchup versus Alabama '87
Notre Dame defeated No. 10 Alabama 37-6,on November 14, 1987 as Tony Rice directed an option offense that gained 352 yards on the ground which offset the effort of the Crimson Tide's star running back Bobby Humphrey—who gained 94 yards on 14 rushes himself. With the score tied at 3-3 after the first quarter, Rice had a 12-yard touchdown run and a 3-yard touchdown pass to tight end Andy Heck in the second quarter. Notre Dame led 20-6 at the half. Irish running backs' Mark Green and Ricky Watters ended the game with 74 and 75-yard touchdown runs respectively to complete the rout. Rice wound up completing 5 of 8 passes for 117 yards while rushing 9 times for 30 yards.

The 1988 national championship season
1988 saw Notre Dame claim its first National Championship in 11 years. For the season the team went a perfect 12-0 en route to an NCAA-record eighth AP National Championship since the poll began in 1936. The season featured wins over top ranked opponents including Michigan, USC, and Miami in addition to featuring several future NFL players Raghib "Rocket" Ismail, Ricky Watters, Chris Zorich, Derek Brown, Todd Lyght, Pat Terrell, Tony Brooks, Anthony Johnson, Andy Heck, Tim Grunhard and Rodney Culver. In all, 21 of the 22 starters on the 1988 National Championship team played in the NFL, the lone exception being Tony Rice.

Matchup versus Miami '88
Miami was No.1 and Notre Dame No.4 when they met in Notre Dame, Indiana on October 15, 1988. The Irish held a 31-21 lead in the third quarter, but the Hurricanes rallied to within 31-30 on a touchdown with 45 seconds left in the game. The Canes went for the two-point conversion and missed as Notre Dame's safety Pat Terrell batted down the ball. The loss snapped a 36-game, regular season winning streak for the Miami Hurricanes.

Rice, who opened up the scoring with a 7-yard touchdown run in the first quarter, completed 8 of 16 passes for 195 yards that included a 9-yard touchdown pass to running back Braxston Banks in the second quarter.

Matchup versus Penn State '88
No. 1 Notre Dame ran its record to a perfect 10-0 by defeating Penn State, 21-3, at home on November 19, 1988. Tony Rice completed  the longest pass play of his career—a 67 yarder to flanker Raghib "Rocket" Ismail for a touchdown. Rice went 10-of-18 passing for 181 yards while rushing 15 times for a game-high 84 yards and a touchdown. The victory was never in doubt as the Irish had built a 14-0 lead in the 2nd quarter.

Matchup versus USC '88
A week later, #1 Notre Dame visited #2 USC at the L.A. Coliseum. The USC team led by All-American and future Johnny Unitas Golden Arm Award winner Rodney Peete was 10-0 and a formidable team. Entering the game Peete was leading the nation in passing and was a frontrunner for the Heisman Trophy. Notre Dame played without its leading pass catcher Ricky Watters, and leading rusher Tony Brooks, both of whom were suspended for arriving late to team meetings. Tony Rice had a spectacular day, including a 65-yard touchdown run on the Irish's first drive. The Irish won the game 27-10, and their win propelled them into the National Championship game.

Rice finished with 13 rushes for 86 yards and completing 5 of 9 passes for 91 yards against the Trojans.

Fiesta Bowl
Coming into the 1989 Fiesta Bowl, Notre Dame coach Lou Holtz insisted that his team couldn't pass the ball against West Virginia. Tony Rice outplayed Mountaineer quarterback Major Harris, who went down with an injury early in the game, by completing 7 of 11 passes for 213 yards and two touchdowns.

Rice finished the year with 1,176 yards and 8 touchdowns passing and 700 yards and 9 touchdowns rushing.

Senior season, 1989
Tony Rice entered his senior season with high expectations following the successes from a year ago. Preseason ranked No. 2 Notre Dame faced a schedule that included games against five ranked opponents.

On September 16, 1989, the Irish defeated the Wolverines in Ann Arbor, Mich. 24-19, which included two Raghib "Rocket" Ismail kickoff returns for scores The next week, Notre Dame defeated Michigan State as Notre Dame's  running backs Ricky Watters and Anthony Johnson scored touchdowns.

Notre Dame then traveled to face #17 Air Force on October 14, 1989. In what became a shootout, Rice went 9-of-13 passing for 123 yards and rushed 14 times for 71 yards against the Falcons' defense. He also threw a 27-yard touchdown pass to Johnson as the Irish defeated the Falcons 41–27 as Air Force's QB Dee Dowis passed for 306 yards.

Coach Lou Holtz's Notre Dame Fighting Irish got to 6-0 and they were ranked #1 in the country. The Irish faced USC at home on October 21, 1989 in what turned into sloppy play by both sides. Notre Dame overcame five turnovers to win 28-24, thanks to a fine effort from the defense led by linebacker Chris Zorich.  The Irish were down 17-7 at halftime. Rice scored on touchdown runs of 7 and 15 yards and finished with 99 yards on 18 carries.  He also threw for 91 yards off 5 of 16 passing attempts.

The season resumed as Rice directed Notre Dame's offense to 310 yards rushing in their October 28, 1989 45-7 over Pittsburgh. Rice had 12 carries for 69 yards and went 1-of-7 passing for 29 yards against the Panthers.

On November 18, 1989, Notre Dame extended its record to 11-0 by defeating #17 Penn State, 34-23. Rice had a career-high 141 rushing yards and completed 5 of 10 passes for 47 yards as the Irish finished with 425 yards on the ground against the Nittany Lions. At this point, Notre Dame had a 23-game winning streak.

Matchup with Miami  '89
On November 25, 1989, #1 Notre Dame traveled to face 7th-ranked Miami (10-1). Miami grabbed a 17-10 halftime lead and won 27-10, and, led by its defensive tackle Cortez Kennedy and help from his teammates, shut down Notre Dame's running attack as Rice was limited to 50 yards on 20 carries. Rice's passing was 7-of-15 for 106 yards.  It was a tough day for the Irish as they lost the rematch, 27-10.

Matchup with #1 Colorado (Orange Bowl)
4th-ranked Notre Dame faced #1 Colorado (11-0) in the Orange Bowl. After a 0-0 score at halftime, the 2nd half opened with Rice directing a 69-yard drive in seven plays as fullback Anthony Johnson scored from the 2-yard line to give Notre Dame a 7-0 lead. Raghib "Rocket" Ismail, filling in at tailback for an injured Ricky Watters, scored a 36-yard touchdown run to increase Notre Dame's lead to 14-0 with 7:19 left in the third quarter. The Irish won the game, 21-6.

Rice completed 5 of 9 passes for 99 yards and rushed 14 times for 50 yards. Notre Dame completed a successful 12-1 season and was ranked #2 by the AP College Football Poll after the win over Colorado.

Conclusion to senior year and career at Notre Dame
Tony Rice's record as a starting quarterback for the University of Notre Dame was 31-4 that included a national championship and almost another. Rice won the Johnny Unitas Golden Arm Award on December 1, 1989 and finished fourth in the 1989 Heisman Trophy voting a day later. He also made the 1989 College Football All-America Team as a quarterback. His regular season statistics had him completing 68-of-137 passes for 1,122 yards and two touchdowns and rushing 174 times for 884 yards and 7 touchdowns in 12 games. He had a longest run of 38 yards while his longest pass play of the season covered 52 yards.

Statistics

Notes - Statistics from the table include bowl game performances.

Professional career
Tony Rice was passed up by the NFL Draft on April 22–23, 1990.  He opted for the CFL after NFL teams shied away from him because of his slight, 6-foot-1 build and his success as a runner, not a passer.  In June 1990, Rice was working with the Saskatchewan Roughriders during training camp as the third-string quarterback behind starter Kent Austin.  The Roughriders finished 9-9 in his only season in the CFL as Rice served in mop-up duty while the starting quarterback Austin threw for 4,604 yards.

After his short stint with the Roughriders of the CFL, Rice began checking other options.  

In February 1991, he was drafted in the second round by the Barcelona Dragons in Spain of the World League of American Football, which played its football season in the spring beginning in March.

Rice's first season with Barcelona was very successful as the Dragons finished 9-3 and reached the championship game that was known as the "World Bowl '91."  Rice's Dragons fell to the London Monarchs, 21-0.  He had nearly equal playing time with the team's starter, Scott Erney, as Rice went 69-of-129 passing for 915 yards with 1 touchdown and 3 interceptions for the season.  He had 33 rushes for 210 yards and 2 touchdowns in his first year with the new football league.

The next season was not as prosperous for Barcelona as the team finished at 5-6.  The Sacramento Surge knocked them out of the playoffs, 17-15, on May 31, 1992.  As the backup quarterback, Rice was 22-of-57 passing for 313 yards and had 102 yards rushing and a touchdown for the 1992 season.

The World League of American Football ceased its operations following the 1992 season.  Rice then joined the Munich Thunder of the Football League of Europe in Munich, Germany in 1994 and played quarterback for one season there as this was his last go around with professional football.

Personal
Tony Rice and his ex-wife Felicia have five children—Alex from Bad Girls Club (season 12), Madeline Santi, Anthony, Michael, and Jasmine.   Anthony is a wide receiver for Central Michigan University.  

Rice works at Arthur J. Gallagher & Co., an insurance brokerage and risk management firm as Vice President of Employee Benefits, and works closely with Pop Warner teams making visits and giving speeches and is active in the D.A.R.E. program, fighting to keep kids off drugs.

References

External links
 "Catholics versus Convicts, Tony Rice leads Notre Dame to victory over Miami during the 1988 National Championship Season
 Tony Rice in action versus USC during the 1989 season
 Sports Illustrated article featuring Tony Rice and Proposition 48
 2006 Interview with Tony Rice (IGN.com)

1967 births
Living people
American football quarterbacks
Notre Dame Fighting Irish football players
Barcelona Dragons players
People from Greenwood, South Carolina
People from Woodruff, South Carolina
American expatriate players of American football